Victoria Lakshmi Hamah is a National Democratic Congress politician in Ghana.

Politics 
In the 2012 general election, she contested the Ablekuma West constituency parliamentary seat.

She served as Deputy Minister of Communications under the John Dramani Mahama administration until Friday, 8 November 2013.

She currently runs a non profit organisation for women - Progressive Organisation for Women's Advancement (POWA).

Victoria Lakshmi Hamah was sacked in 2013 from her position as Deputy Communications Ministers after an audio tape of her was heard telling an unnamed friend that she would not quit politics until she had made at least one million US Dollars (US$1m).  The conversation also made mentions of other public officials and politicians linked to all kinds of corrupt practice.

References

Living people
Government ministers of Ghana
Ghanaian Hindus
National Democratic Congress (Ghana) politicians
Women government ministers of Ghana
Year of birth missing (living people)